"Right Now" is the debut single of English girl group Atomic Kitten from their first album of the same name (2000). The song was re-recorded twice: once for the album's 2001 re-issue with new member Jenny Frost and again in 2004 for the group's Greatest Hits album. The 2004 version, titled "Right Now 2004", proved to be a greater international chart success. The song was written by Atomic Kitten founders and Orchestral Manoeuvres in the Dark members Andy McCluskey and Stuart Kershaw.

Release
The single was released on 29 November 1999. "Right Now" stayed in the British charts for 11 weeks, reaching number 10. In Belgium, the song peaked at number 17, charting for eight weeks. In Oceania, "Right Now" peaked at 40 in New Zealand and 72 in Australia.

Music video
The video for the original 1999 release opens with workmen assembling the tiled dancefloor inside the studio. It shows Atomic Kitten walking through Liverpool wearing wet and shiny jackets, in a baker's shop, down in a lift in a department store, getting in a car, and on an open top double decker bus. This video includes the shots of Natasha Hamilton, Liz McClarnon, and Kerry Katona in three tunnels at a time (red and blue). During the first chorus, the group members and dancers dance on the multi-coloured tiled dancefloor with holes to the tunnels, radio speakers at the side, and a green ramp.

Track listings

UK CD1
 "Right Now" (radio edit) – 3:28
 "Right Now" (Solomon pop mix) – 5:50
 "Right Now" (K-Klass Phazerphunk radio edit) – 3:32
 "Right Now" (video) – 3:37

UK CD2
 "Right Now" (radio edit) – 3:28
 "Something Spooky" (theme to BBC's Belfry Witches) – 2:40
 "Right Now" (original demo) – 3:36

UK cassette single
 "Right Now" (radio edit) – 3:28
 "Something Spooky" (theme to BBC's Belfry Witches) – 2:40
 Exclusive interview – 7:35

European CD single
 "Right Now" (radio edit) – 3:28
 "Something Spooky" (theme to BBC's Belfry Witches) – 2:40

Australian CD single (2001)
 "Right Now" – 3:35
 "Eternal Flame" – 3:15
 "Right Now" (K-Klass Phazerfunk club mix) – 7:22
 "Eternal Flame" (Blacksmith RnB dub) – 3:55
 "Eternal Flame" (video) – 3:10

Credits and personnel
Credits are lifted from the UK CD1 liner notes and the Right Now album booklet.

Studios
 Recorded at Motor Museum Studios (Liverpool, England) and Olympic Studios (London, England)
 Original version mastered at The Town House (London, England)
 2001 version mastered at Whitfield St Studios (London, England)

Personnel

 Stuart Kershaw – writing
 Andy McCluskey – writing
 Atomic Kitten – vocals
 Tracy Ackerman – backing vocals
 Tracy Carmen – backing vocals
 Engine – all instruments, vocal production
 Milton McDonald – additional guitar
 Isobel Griffiths – strings
 Nick Ingman – string arrangement and conductor

 Absolute – production
 Steven Fitzmaurice – mixing
 Pete Craigie – vocal mixing
 Pat O'Shaughnessy – vocal engineering
 John Davis – mastering (2001)
 Form – artwork design
 Rankin – photohgraphy
 Graham Rounthwaite – illustration

Charts

2004 version

In 2004, as Atomic Kitten decided to take a break, they released one more single to say goodbye. It was the double-A side "Someone like Me" / "Right Now 2004". The remix is exclusive on the group's 2004 Greatest Hits album. While the original version was a 1990s disco pop song, the 2004 version is more in the vein of early 2000s dance songs.

Chart performance
"Someone like Me" / "Right Now 2004" achieved a better position on the UK Singles Chart than the original release of "Right Now", peaking at number eight, and reached the top 20 in Ireland. It was the group's lowest charting single in Germany, peaking at number 67, and in Switzerland, reaching number 42. In the Netherlands, it was their second-lowest-charting single, behind "Love Doesn't Have to Hurt".

Music video
The video accompanying the 2004 re-recording shows Hamilton, McClarnon, and Jenny Frost rehearsing and performing a concert, intercut with backstage footage and glimpses of press conferences, holidays, and television appearances.

Track listings

UK CD1
 "Someone like Me" – 2:05
 "Right Now 2004" – 3:45

UK CD2
 "Right Now 2004" – 3:45
 "Someone like Me" – 2:05
 "Wild" – 3:42
 "Right Now 2004" (video) – 3:45

European CD single
 "Right Now 2004" – 3:45
 "Someone like Me" – 2:05

European maxi-single
 "Right Now 2004" – 3:45
 "Someone like Me" – 2:05
 "Wild" – 3:42

Personnel
 Natasha Hamilton – co-lead vocals
 Liz McClarnon – co-lead vocals
 Jenny Frost – co-lead vocals

Charts
All entries charted with "Someone like Me" except where noted.

References

External links
 Atomic Kitten (official website)

1999 debut singles
1999 songs
Atomic Kitten songs
Innocent Records singles
Songs written by Andy McCluskey
Songs written by Stuart Kershaw
Virgin Records singles